Home Everywhere is the sixth studio album by American rock band Medicine, released in October 2014 on the Captured Tracks label.

Track listing

References

2014 albums
Medicine (band) albums